Thomas Muster defeated Michael Chang in the final, 7–5, 6–2, 6–4, to win the men's singles tennis title at the 1995 French Open. He became the first Austrian to win a major title.

Sergi Bruguera was the two-time defending champion, but lost to Chang in the semifinals.

During the tournament, Mats Wilander and Karel Novacek tested positive for cocaine, which eventually resulted in a three-month suspension from the ATP Tour issued in May 1997. In addition, both players had to return prize money and forfeit ranking points.

Seeds

Qualifying

Draw

Finals

Top half

Section 1

Section 2

Section 3

Section 4

Bottom half

Section 5

Section 6

Section 7

Section 8

References

External links
 Association of Tennis Professionals (ATP) – 1995 French Open Men's Singles draw
1995 French Open – Men's draws and results at the International Tennis Federation

Men's Singles
French Open by year – Men's singles
1995 ATP Tour